Kachaghakaberd is a mountain-top fortress located between the villages of Kolatak and Khndzristan, in the disputed region of Nagorno-Karabakh, de facto in the Askeran Province of the Republic of Artsakh, de jure in the Khojaly District of Azerbaijan.

The Janapar Trail runs very near to the fortress. A short side trail takes to the top of the fortress.

Etymology 

Kachaghakaberd is translated from Armenian as magpie's fortress, a combination of the words կաչաղաք (kachaghak, designating the bird magpie) and բերդ (berd, meaning fortress).

Architecture 
The fortress was an important fortification of the medieval Armenian Principality of Khachen that thrived in the High Middle Ages, and is located at a height of more than 1700 meters, surrounded by vertical limestone cliffs with the heights of 50–60 meters, has a hard-to-reach entrance from the southern side of the fortress. During its history no one could ever storm the fortress. Parts of the defensive walls remain standing. 

The territory of the fortress occupies a large area, though it seems small. Many rooms, secret passages cut into the cliffs, and special loopholes for throwing stones at enemies are inside its territory. The water supply problem was solved by a unique method: two rock-cut reservoirs to store rain and melt-water are in the center of the fortress. Fresh water was brought from a spring at the foot of the mountain.

Gallery

See also 
 Culture of Azerbaijan
 Culture of Artsakh
 Principality of Khachen
 Kingdom of Artsakh

References 

Buildings and structures in the Republic of Artsakh
Tourist attractions in the Republic of Artsakh
Castles and fortresses in Azerbaijan